is the name of multiple train stations in Japan.

 Kusano Station (Fukushima) - in Fukushima Prefecture
 Kusano Station (Hyōgo) - in Hyōgo Prefecture